Seán Currie (born 1999) is an Irish hurler who plays for Dublin Senior Championship club Na Fianna and at inter-county level with the Dublin senior hurling team. He usually lines out as a centre-forward.

Career

A member of the Na Fianna club in Glasnevin, Currie first came to prominence at schools' level with the combined Dublin North team that won the Leinster Colleges Championship in 2018. He subsequently appeared with DCU Dóchas Éireann in the Fitzgibbon Cup. Currie made his first appearance on the inter-county scene as a member of the Dublin minor team during the 2017 Leinster Championship, ending the season as one of the top scorers and by being named on the Minor Team of the Year. He subsequently progressed onto the under-21/20 teams before joining the Dublin senior hurling team in 2021, alongside his brother Colin Currie.

Career statistics

Honours

Dublin North
Leinster Colleges Senior Hurling Championship: 2018

References

External links
Seán Currie profile at the Dublin GAA website

1999 births
Living people
Na Fianna hurlers
Dublin inter-county hurlers